PKU Healthcare Corp., Ltd. formerly known as PKU International Healthcare Group Southwest Pharmaceutical Co., Ltd., is a Chinese pharmaceutical company. The major shareholder was PKU Healthcare Group, a subsidiary of PKU Founder Group. PKU Founder Group itself is a subsidiary of Peking University, in turn making the listed company a state-owned enterprise by broader definition.

History
PKU International Healthcare Group Southwest Pharmaceutical Co., Ltd. known also as Southwest Synthetic Pharmaceuticals, is an indirect subsidiary of Peking University since 2003. In 2013 the company was renamed into PKU Healthcare Corp., Ltd..

Foundation (1993–2003)
The factory itself was founded in 1965.

Due to financial difficulties, 1.26% shares of the listed company was acquired by Sichuan No.2 Electric Power Construction in 2001 from the parent entity (Southwest Synthetic Pharmaceutical Factory).

Acquired by Founder Group (2003–)
In 2002 47.31% shares of the listed company was entrusted to a private company by the parent (Southwest Synthetic Pharmaceutical Factory). In June 2003, China Huarong Asset Management, the state-owned bad bank, made a public offer to sell the credit of themselves to the parent entity (Southwest Synthetic Pharmaceutical Factory); On 4 September the parent entity was re-incorporated as Chongqing Southwest Synthetic Pharmaceutical Co., Ltd., with part of the debt was converted into share capital, making state-owned China Development Bank owned 39.80% share capital as second largest shareholder.

Since acquired by PKU Founder Group, Southwest Synthetic Pharmaceutical received assets from the parent company and renamed to PKU Healthcare in 2013.

Shareholders
As at 31 December 2015, PKU Healthcare Group owned 40.38% shares of PKU Healthcare directly and indirectly (via Southwest Pharmaceutical Group ) as the largest shareholder; PKU Founder Group was the parent company of PKU Healthcare Group for 85.60%, with the rest were owned by Peking University ; Peking University's wholly owned subsidiary: Peking University Asset Management owned 70% stake of PKU Founder Group; as Peking University was supervised by the Ministry of Education, PKU Healthcare was considered a state-owned enterprise in a border definition; Peking University Asset Management also owned an additional 0.36% via another subsidiary (40.74% in total).

The second largest shareholder was China Securities Finance for 1.94% shares.

PKU Healthcare Group owned 51.95% shares at 31 December 2012. However, it was later found that the private company did not pay PKU Healthcare Group due to its financial difficulty. Instead, the company signed an agreement with PKU Resources Group Holdings, sister company of PKU Healthcare Group to hold the shares of the listed company as a proxy of PKU Resources Group Holdings. All 3 companies were fined by China Securities Regulatory Commission in 2016.

Zenith Holdings also sold the shares in 2014 (1.73% for  each and an additional 4.44% for undisclosed price) and in 2015; at the same time PKU Healthcare Group announced that the company would bought back not more than 2% shares in November 2014 from public market. In July 2015 0.18% shares were bought for  each. In October PKU Healthcare announced that the share buy back program was completed.

Footnotes

References

Companies listed on the Shenzhen Stock Exchange
Companies based in Chongqing
Peking University
Government-owned companies of China
Pharmaceutical companies of China
Chinese brands